Sadrabad may refer to:
 Sadrabad, Kazerun, Fars province
 Sadrabad, Shiraz, Fars province
 Sadrabad, Nuq, Rafsanjan County, Kerman province
 Sadrabad, Markazi
 Sadrabad, Qazvin
 Sadrabad, Nishapur, Razavi Khorasan province
 Sadrabad, Sarakhs, Razavi Khorasan province
 Sadrabad, Sistan and Baluchestan, a village in Sistan and Baluchestan Province
 Sadrabad, Saduq, Yazd province
 Sadrabad, Meybod, Meybod County, Yazd province
 Sadrabad Rural District, Meybod County, Yazd province